Henllan is a village in Ceredigion, Wales.

Henllan is situated along minor roads off the A484 Cardigan to Carmarthen road, some 3 miles (5 km) east of Newcastle Emlyn and now merges as a result of infill development with the small settlement of Trebedw. The settlement lies to the south of the Teifi Valley Railway amidst steep, attractive woodland areas (many of which are subject to Tree Preservation Orders) in the Teifi Valley. The name is Old Welsh, Hên-llan, meaning "old church-enclosure".

Henllan comprises over 90 dwellings. It has a post office and local community facilities, is served by the new 'Super School' at Llandysul and by Newcastle Emlyn for other shops and services. The Welsh language is in every day use. Henllan is served by a bus route between Carmarthen and Newcastle Emlyn, serviced on a daily basis.

Several enterprises are located in the settlement, including the old railway station at Henllan, which is the centre for the Vale of Teifi Railway Preservation Society, and an important tourist facility for the area. There used to be auction rooms where there is now a garden centre; and there is an artist's studio (Diane Matthias). In the settlement and to the south lies a former prisoner of war camp, which is currently used for light industrial and storage purposes. There is  a Catholic chapel, Capel Eidalwyr, built by prisoners of war. To the southeast of the village at Pen-ffynnon on the A484 is the West Wales Museum of Childhood, displaying a collection of toys, many of which were made in Wales by companies that have closed, such as Corgi Toys.

The walk from the bridge to Henllan Falls is owned by the National Trust

References

Villages in Ceredigion